Pectinida is a taxonomic order of large and medium-sized saltwater clams, marine bivalve molluscs, commonly known as scallops and their allies.  It is believed that they began evolutionarily in the late Middle Ordovician epoch; many species, of course, are still extant.

2010 taxonomy
In 2010 a new proposed classification system for the Bivalvia was published by Bieler, Carter & Coan, revising the classification of the Bivalvia, including the order Pectinida.

Superfamily: Anomioidea
Family: Anomiidae (jingle shells) 
Family: Placunidae (windowpane oysters & saddle oysters)
Superfamily: Plicatuloidea
Family: Plicatulidae (kittenpaws)
Superfamily: Dimyoidea
Family: Dimyidae (dimyidarian oysters)
Superfamily: Pectinoidea
Family: Entoliidae (entoliids)
Family: Pectinidae (scallops)
Family: Propeamussiidae (propeamussiids)
Family: Spondylidae (thorny oysters)

References

 
Bivalve orders